State Highway 134 (SH 134) is a  long state highway in northern Colorado. SH 134's western terminus is at SH 131 in Toponas, and the eastern terminus is at U.S. Route 40 (US 40) north of Kremmling.

Route description
SH 134 begins in the west at Toponas and proceeds eastward entering Routt National Forest after three miles (5 km). At Gore Pass the route moves into Arapaho National Forest through which it passes for roughly three miles before leaving National Forest Service land. SH 134 continues for approximately eight more miles to its eastern terminus at US 40 six miles (10 km) north of Kremmling.

History
The routing was originally part of the route SH 84. Then, after the U.S. Routes were established, to avoid confusion with US 84, the route was renumbered to SH 134 in 1968. There have been no major routing changes since SH 84 was established.

Major intersections

See also

 List of state highways in Colorado

References

External links

134
Transportation in Routt County, Colorado
Transportation in Grand County, Colorado